Events from the year 2021 in the British Virgin Islands.

Incumbents

Governor: 
 Until 23 January Augustus Jaspert
 23 January - 29 January David Archer (acting)
 From 29 January John Rankin
Premier: Andrew Fahie

Events

January
 12 January - The UK Government announces it is withdrawing funding from the BVI's Recovery and Development Agency.
 18 January - The Governor forms a Commission of Inquiry in order to "look into whether corruption, abuse of office or other serious dishonesty in relation to officials — elected, statutory or public — may have taken place in recent years. If so, it will consider the conditions which allowed this to take place and make independent recommendations for improvement."  The Commission is to be headed by retired English Court of Appeal judge, Sir Gary Hickinbottom.

February
 9 February - Earl "Bob" Hodge is shot and killed.  The United States had made repeated unsuccessful attempts to extradite Hodge on allegations of cocaine trafficking.
 24 February - The Premier announces the formation of a review commission in relation to the Constitution of the British Virgin Islands.

May
4 May - The Commission of Inquiry in relation to the Government led by Sir Gary Hickinbottom starts sitting.

July
 2 July - The Territory records its second death from Covid-19.

August
 6 August - The Territory's Covid-19 death toll climbs to 37.

October
 22 October - Evidence gathering stage of the Commission of Inquiry concludes.
 28 October - The Government proposes a motion in the House of Assembly that the financial burden of a costs order against the Speaker of the House be met from public funds.
 29 October - On online petition criticising the government's decision to pay the legal costs of the Speaker of the House in relation to a failed injunction application receives over 1,000 signatures in the first 24 hours.

See also
2021 in the Caribbean

Footnotes

 
2020s in the British Virgin Islands
British Virgin Islands